Vignarajah is a given name. Notable people with the name include: 

 K. Vignarajah, Sri Lankan politician
 Krish O'Mara Vignarajah, American immigration and refugee advocate
 Kumaravelu Vignarajah, Sri Lankan spy and member of  Liberation Tigers of Tamil Eelam
 Thiruvendran Vignarajah (born 1976), American attorney and politician 

Tamil masculine given names